Manilal Chaturbhai Shah was an Indian politician. He was a Member of Parliament  representing Bombay State in the Rajya Sabha the upper house of India's Parliament as member  of the  Indian National Congress.

References

Rajya Sabha members from Maharashtra
Indian National Congress politicians
Year of birth missing
Year of death missing